Tiferonia is a genus of beetle in the family Carabidae first described by Philip Jackson Darlington Jr. in 1962.

Species 
Tiferonia contains the following six species:

 Tiferonia brunnea (Jedlicka, 1935)
 Tiferonia leytensis Will, 2020
 Tiferonia parva Darlington, 1962
 Tiferonia schoutedeni (Straneo, 1943)
 Tiferonia sumatrensis Fedorenko, 2022
 Tiferonia trapezicollis Fedorenko, 2022

References

Pterostichinae